Langfjorden (literally "The Long Fjord") may refer to:  

Langfjorden (Alta), arm of the Altafjord in Alta, Finnmark county, Norway
Langfjorden (Loppa), a continuation of the Nordre and Søndre Bergsfjord, in Loppa, Finnmark county, Norway
Langfjorden (Møre og Romsdal), arm of the Romsdalsfjord near Molde, Møre og Romsdal county, Norway
Langfjorden (Nordland), fjord near Velfjord in Brønnøy, Nordland county, Norway
Langfjorden (Troms), fjord near Arnøy in Skjervøy, Troms county, Norway
Langfjorden (Sør-Varanger), arm of the Bøkfjord in Sør-Varanger, Finnmark county, Norway
Langfjorden (Tana), arm of the Tanafjord in Deatnu-Tana, Finnmark county, Norway
Langfjord Tunnel, proposed to cross the fjord in Møre og Romsdal